Butler English, also known as Bearer English or Kitchen English, is a dialect of English that first developed as an occupational dialect in the years of the Madras Presidency in India, but that has developed over time and is now associated mainly with social class rather than occupation. It is still spoken in major metropolitan cities.

The name derives from its origins with butlers, the head servants of British colonial households, and is the English that they used to communicate with their masters.

Here is an example of Butler English (a butler reporting his being invited to England):

Another example, now famous amongst Indian English linguists, is the one given by Schuchardt (see Further reading), which is a nurse, an ayah, describing the butler's practice of secretly taking small amounts of milk for himself from his master's household:

Features
Structurally, Butler English is akin to a pidgin, with a subject–verb–object word order, deletion of verb inflections, and deletion of prepositions. It has been called a "marginal pidgin" and a "rudimentary pidgin", although Hosali and Aitchinson, listed in Further reading, point out several problems with these classifications. Its major syntactic characteristics are the deletion of auxiliary verbs, the frequent use of "-ing" forms for things other than participles, and the reporting of indirect speech directly. For examples:
the use of the present participle for the future tense: I telling rather than the Standard English "I will tell"
the use of "done" as an auxiliary instead of "have": I done come rather than "I have come", and I done tell rather than "I have told"

The lexical characteristics of Butler English are that its vocabulary is limited and employs specialised jargon. family substitutes for "wife", for example.

Mesthrie notes several "striking similarities" between Butler English and South African Indian English, raising for him the question of whether there was a historical relationship between the two. These include:
 use of "-ing" forms for things other than participles
 the omission of "be"
 the use of "got" as an auxiliary verb instead of "have" (Mesthrie questions the accuracy of the reports by Yule and Burnell that were the original source of the information that "done" was an auxiliary verb, observing that the 20th century reports by Hosali and others state that this is not a characteristic of 20th century Butler English.)
 various lexical similarities including "died" being used instead of "dead"

He notes various dissimilarities, however:
 Butler English uses "been" as an auxiliary verb whereas SAIE does not.
 Because of pronoun deletion, "is" can begin a sentence in Butler English, whereas such pronoun deletion is less common in SAIE.
 Butler English has no clear examples of "-s" as a possessive, whereas in SAIE that have a 15/17 occurrence rate.
 Butler English does not share SAIE's use of "only" as a focus marker
 Butler English does not share SAIE's use of "got" as an existential
 Butler English does not share SAIE's occasional subject–object–verb word order (e.g. four children got for "I have four children.", after pronoun deletion), although he observes that the famous quotation reported by Schuchardt contains one object–verb example: little milk give it
 Butler English does have various lexical forms found in SAIE, such as look-attering, no fadder, hawa, and dawa

Further reading 
 , which can be found translated and edited in:
 
  (reprinted in 1903 by W. Crooke)
 , also published as:

References

English-based pidgins and creoles
Indian English
Languages attested from the 2nd millennium
Languages extinct in the 20th century
Butlers
Culture of Chennai
20th century in Chennai